The Southern League was the amatorial football championship in Southern Italy during the 20's of the 20th century.

The 1922–23 season was the first one organized within the Italian Football Federation. The winner had the honor to play against the Northern Champions.

The League took over the former CCI Regional championship, maintaining the goal to improve the quality of the game in the area. Southern semifinals with six matchdays were introduced following the limitation of the regional phase to ten matchdays.

Qualifications

Marche 
Anconitana was the only subscribed team and advanced directly to the semifinals.

Lazio

Classification

Results table

Campania

Classification 

Puteolana retired and disbanded.

Results table

Apulia

Classification

Results table

Sicily 
A previous qualification tournament, with home and away matches, started without FIGC's permission and was declared void. Anyway, the three sides had ended the tournament with 2 points each.

Classification

Results

Semifinals

Group A 

Pro Italia Taranto had to retire from the championship due to lack of players: most of the players were soldiers and Taranto's military command denied them to play in this tournament and against civilian sides again.

Classification

Results table

Group B

Classification

Results table

Finals

Footnotes

Football in Italy